Rajeev Ram is the defending champion, but lost to Dustin Brown  at the semifinals.
Brown won the title, by defeating Igor Sijsling 6–3, 7–6(3) in the final.

Seeds

Draw

Finals

Top half

Bottom half

References
 Main Draw
 Qualifying Draw

Lambertz Open by STAWAG - Singles
Lambertz Open by STAWAG